Kurt Haas (19 January 1909 – 23 September 1992) was a Swiss rower. He competed in the men's double sculls event at the 1936 Summer Olympics.

References

1909 births
1992 deaths
Swiss male rowers
Olympic rowers of Switzerland
Rowers at the 1936 Summer Olympics
Place of birth missing